Malovyskivskyi Raion was a raion (district) of Kirovohrad Oblast in central Ukraine. The city of Mala Vyska was the administrative center of the raion. The raion was abolished on 18 July 2020 as part of the administrative reform of Ukraine, which reduced the number of raions of Kirovohrad Oblast to four. The area of Mala Vyska Raion was merged into Novoukrainka Raion.

The raion was mostly agricultural with some industries located around the regional center. Major products included sugar beets and sugar, milk and some cereal products. Mala Vyska was also the location for the regional boarding school and the regional administration. Outside of Mala Vyska, the raion was composed of several small towns and villages.

At the time of disestablishment, the raion consisted of four hromadas: 
 Mala Vyska urban hromada with the administration in Mala Vyska;
 Marianivka rural hromada with the administration in the selo of Marianivka;
 Smoline settlement hromada with the administration in the urban-type settlement of Smoline;
 Zlynka rural hromada with the administration in the selo of Zlynka.

References

Former raions of Kirovohrad Oblast
1923 establishments in Ukraine
Ukrainian raions abolished during the 2020 administrative reform